Mahtomedi is a city in Washington County, Minnesota, United States. The population was 7,676 at the 2010 census.  Mahtomedi is a suburb of St. Paul and is located between St. Paul and Stillwater.

Geography
Mahtomedi is about 15 miles northeast of St. Paul, the capital of Minnesota. Interstate 694 and Mahtomedi Avenue are two of the main routes in the community.

History
Mahtomedi was platted in 1883. The city name is from the Dakota for White Bear Lake -  "bear", and  "lake". A post office was established at Mahtomedi in 1884 and remains in operation today on Wildwood Road.

Education

Mahtomedi is home to its own school district, which services Dellwood, Grant, Hugo, Mahtomedi, Pine Springs, Willernie, and parts of Lake Elmo, Oakdale, Stillwater, and White Bear Lake:

Wildwood Elementary (K-2) (commonly referred to as 'Wildwood')
Oscar Henry Anderson Elementary (3-5) (commonly referred to as 'OHA', 'OH', or 'OH Anderson')
Mahtomedi Middle School (6-8) (commonly referred to as 'MMS')
Mahtomedi Senior High School (9-12) (commonly referred to as 'MHS')
Mahtomedi High School was ranked the best high school in Minnesota in 2013.

In addition to the Mahtomedi Public School District, Mahtomedi also is home to the St. Jude of the Lake School.  St. Jude's is a private catholic school that educates students from preschool to sixth grade. They will be adding a seventh grade in Fall 2022, followed by an eighth grade in Fall 2023.

Half of Century College, a member of the MNSCU system, is located in Mahtomedi.  The other half is located in White Bear Lake, which is the mailing address for the college. Century Avenue, which runs north and south, is the dividing line between Washington and Ramsey counties and between White Bear Lake and Mahtomedi.  A long footbridge extends between the West Campus and East Campus of Century College.

High School Athletics

The school colors of Mahtomedi Senior High School are blue and gold and the mascot is the Zephyr. Mahtomedi is well known for its girls' soccer and also for its high school football team. The girls team won the state championship in 2004, 2005, 2006, 2008, 2017, 2018, and 2019. The football team won the state championship in 2005 in an overtime win against the Academy of Holy Angels. On November 5, 2009, Mahtomedi's Boys Varsity soccer team won its first state championship against Hermantown. The Mahtomedi Zephyr gymnastics team has also won state 10 times, winning their first in 1982. The Mahtomedi Girls' tennis team also won their first state title in 2016 against the Edina Hornets who had won the past 19 years prior. Most recently, the Mahtomedi Boys’ hockey team won state in 2020. The Zephyr mascot originally came from the 1930s car Lincoln Zephyr. However, the Zephyr mascot currently references Zephyrus, the Greek god of the west wind.

Demographics

As of 2000 the median income for a household in the city was $72,215, and the median income for a family was $81,923. Males had a median income of $52,656 versus $36,306 for females. The per capita income for the city was $28,930. About 1.6% of families and 2.7% of the population were below the poverty line, including 2.8% of those under age 18 and 5.8% of those age 65 or over.

2010 census
As of the census of 2010, there were 7,676 people, 2,827 households, and 2,126 families residing in the city. The racial makeup of the city was 94.2% White, 2.3% African American, 0.2% Native American, 1.2% Asian, 0.1% Pacific Islander, 0.3% from other races, and 1.7% from two or more races. Hispanic or Latino of any race were 1.3% of the population.

There were 2,827 households, of which 38.8% had children under the age of 18 living with them, 62.4% were married couples living together, 9.5% had a female householder with no husband present, 3.3% had a male householder with no wife present, and 24.8% were non-families. 21.6% of all households were made up of individuals, and 10.7% had someone living alone who was 65 years of age or older. The average household size was 2.65 and the average family size was 3.11.

The median age in the city was 44.2 years. 27.1% of residents were under the age of 18; 6.4% were between the ages of 18 and 24; 17.9% were from 25 to 44; 35.3% were from 45 to 64; and 13.3% were 65 years of age or older. The gender makeup of the city was 48.4% male and 51.6% female.

Notable people
Marilyn Carroll - U of M faculty.
Michael J. George - Minnesota state legislator
Richard W. O'Dea - Minnesota state legislator
Justin Pierre - Lead singer of the band Motion City Soundtrack.
Ben Sobieski - Professional football player.
Warren Strelow - Goalie Coach for the 1980 (Gold Medal) and 2002 (Silver Medal) Olympic Hockey Teams.

References

External links

Cities in Minnesota
Cities in Washington County, Minnesota
Dakota toponyms